Kaleem Strawbrige-Simon (born 8 July 1996) is a professional footballer who plays as a winger for Fleetwood United in the UAE Second Division. Born in England, he plays for the Montserrat national team.

Club career
Simon came through the UCD academy as a student, and made his senior breakthrough as an 18 year old in July 2014. His debut came against Bradford City in a friendly match. He faced competition for places, and after making just 3 appearances for the club, he joined newly promoted side Longford Town in December 2014. He spent 2 seasons there, and established himself as a key squad member, making 54 appearances in total and scoring 3 goals. 

Following the club's relegation after the 2016 season, he sealed a move to Bohemians. He spent the first half of the 2017 season in Phibsborough, where he made 15 league appearances, before returning to Longford in July. By December he had played a further 5 matches 

Pat Devlin signed Kaleem for Cabinteely in February 2018, and he made his debut against Wexford on opening day of the First Division season. He never really found his form, and was offloaded once again in 2019. After 17 games with Athlone Town, he joined NIFL Premiership team Warrenpoint Town, where he failed to make a single appearance.  

Simon spent the first half of 2020 with Wexford FC, but during the summer he secured a move across the water to non league outfit Welling United in the UK. He played 4 games for the club before being released a year later. Drogheda United signed him on a free transfer in August 2021, but he only managed a single substitute appearance in 6 months with the County Louth side 

In September 2022, Simon signed for Fleetwood United in the UAE Second Division, the sister club of League Two side Fleetwood Town.

International career
Born in England to an English father and Irish mother, Simon became eligible to play for Montserrat through his paternal grandmother. Recruitment team of Montserrat Football Association contacted him in Instagram after noticing his eligibility and enquired if he would be interested in representing them. This led to his inclusion in Montserrat national team for World Cup qualifiers in March 2021.

Simon made his international debut on 24 March 2021 in a 2–2 draw against Antigua and Barbuda. He was also eligible to play for Republic of Ireland or Dominica prior to this match.

Career statistics

Club

International

International goals
Scores and results list Montserrat's goal tally first.

References

External links
 

1996 births
Living people
Association football forwards
Footballers from Greater London
Montserratian footballers
Montserrat international footballers
English footballers
English people of Montserratian descent
English people of Irish descent
Montserratian people of Irish descent
League of Ireland players
National League (English football) players
University College Dublin A.F.C. players
Bohemian F.C. players
Longford Town F.C. players
Athlone Town A.F.C. players
Wexford F.C. players
Welling United F.C. players
Warrenpoint Town F.C. players